Baasskap (also spelled baaskap), literally "boss-ship" or "boss-hood", is an Afrikaans term that was used during apartheid to describe the social, political and economic domination of South Africa by its minority white population generally and by Afrikaners in particular. The term is sometimes translated to the English-language term "white supremacy" and functioned either as a description or an endorsement of white minority rule in South Africa.

Proponents 
Proponents of baasskap constituted the largest faction of apartheid ideologues in the National Party and state institutions. They applied racial segregation in a systematic way to "preserve racial purity" and to ensure that economic and political spheres were dominated by Afrikaners. However, proponents of baasskap were not necessarily opposed to black South African participation in the economy if black labour was controlled in a way that preserved the economic domination of Afrikaners.

Prominent proponents of baasskap included both J.G. Strydom, Prime Minister from 1954 to 1958, and C.R. Swart, Minister of Justice. Hendrik Verwoerd had sympathy for the "purist" faction of apartheid ideologues, who opposed economic integration of black South Africans, in contrast to supporters of baasskap who wanted white domination but an integrated economy. Nonetheless, Verwoerd provided the hitherto-crude concept of baasskap with a veneer of intellectual respectability.

See also 
Minoritarianism

References

External links

History of South Africa
Afrikaans words and phrases
South African English
Political terminology in South Africa
Apartheid in propaganda
White supremacy in South Africa